The SR-3 Vikhr (СР-3 Вихрь, Russian for "whirlwind") is a Russian 9×39mm compact assault rifle. It was developed by A. D. Borisov, V. N. Levchenko and A. Tyshlykov at TsNIITochMash (Central Institute for Precision Machine Building) in the early 1990s and was manufactured in 1994. Heavily based on the AS Val, but lacks an integral suppressor, has a newly designed folding stock and charging handle for ease of concealed carry. The abbreviation "SR" stands for spetsialnaya razrabotka — special development.

Because the SR-3 Vikhr is a rather expensive weapon for its small size and weight, it was not mass produced for the Russian military. It was primarily used by the Russian Special Operations Forces and certain government officials' security details.

History
After the adoption of the SR-3 Vikhr, the FSB established new operational requirements with a goal to combine the qualities of the SR-3, AS Val and VSS Vintorez, resulting in a new variant designated as the SR-3M (СР-3М).

Design

The SR-3 is a compact assault rifle chambered in 9×39mm subsonic cartridge. It is primarily used with the SP-6 armour piercing ammunition with a hardened steel penetrator, that can penetrate a 6mm steel plate at a range of 200 metres. Along side the SP-6, a lower cost SP-5 ball ammunition with a heavy bullet and PAB-9 ammunition is also used. The SR-3 is based on the AS Val, but lacks the integral suppressor. As a result, it is much more compact than the AS Val.

The SR-3 is a select-fire, gas-operated action with a long stroke piston. It uses the same rotating bolt group from the AS Val, and fires from a closed bolt. It has a more compact, top-folding buttstock and a simplified flip-up rear sight which can be set for 100 metres or 200 metres distance compared to the AS Val. The redesigned charging handle, made in the form of dual sliders above the forearm, and must be grasped by thumb and index finger and then retracted to load the weapon. The trigger unit is generally the same as in the AS Val, but the AK-type safety is replaced by ambidextrous lever above the pistol grip. The fire mode selector is of cross-bolt, push button type and located behind the trigger, inside the trigger guard.

Variants

SR-3M 
The SR-3M is a modernised variant of the SR-3 Vikhr. It receives an improved polymer furniture, a more convenient charging handle, an AS-style controls (safety lever, semi-automatic/full automatic selector switch is inside the trigger guard), an AS-style side-folding stock, a redesigned handguard with a folding foregrip and where the rear sight is now located, a specially developed quick-detachable suppressor, a Warsaw Pact rail mount, and a new magazine with a 30-round capacity which provides a more reliable feeding during automatic fire whilst still compatible with the 10- and 20-round magazines from the SR-3, AS Val and the VSS Vintorez. It is also worth to mention that the 30-round magazine is also compatible with the AS Val and VSS Vintorez. It was ordered in May 2021 by an unnamed foreign country.

SR-3MP 
The SR-3MP is a further modernisation of the SR-3M. It features a new Dovetail rail mount for mounting various optical sights. The handguard receives two Picatinny rails on each side for mounting laser sights, tactical flashlights and other tactical accessories. An additional rail is added below the pistol grip for the folding stock to be mounted for operators who wears a full-face shield mask, bullet-proof helmet or night vision gear to still be able to aim by the shoulder without the stock getting in the way.

Gallery

Users 
: Used by the Federal Security Service.

See also
AS Val
9A-91
AK-9
OTs-12 Tiss
OTs-14 Groza
VSS Vintorez
VSK-94
List of Russian Weaponry
List of Assault Rifles

References

External links

 SR-3/SR-3M "Vikhr" - Modern Firearms
 SR-3/SR-3M "Vikhr" - Technical Information – Russian
 SR-3M Development – Russian

9×39mm firearms
Assault rifles of Russia
Tula Arms Plant products
TsNIITochMash products
Weapons and ammunition introduced in 1995